A Five Star Life (also known as I Travel Alone) is a 2013 Italian comedy-drama film directed by Maria Sole Tognazzi. For her performance, Margherita Buy won the David di Donatello for Best Actress. The film also won the Nastro d'Argento for Best Comedy.

Cast 

 Margherita Buy: Irene
 Stefano Accorsi: Andrea
 Fabrizia Sacchi: Silvia
 Gianmarco Tognazzi: Tommaso
 Alessia Barela: Fabiana
 Lesley Manville: Kate Sherman
 Henry Arnold: Director

Accolades

References

External links

2013 films
Italian comedy-drama films
2013 comedy-drama films
Films directed by Maria Sole Tognazzi
Films set in hotels